Heater's Island Wildlife Management Area is a Wildlife Management Area in Frederick County, Maryland. Heater's Island is a large forested island in the Potomac River near Point of Rocks, Maryland. It was long inhabited by the Piscataway people, who were forced to leave by smallpox in 1705.

See also
 Islands of the Potomac Wildlife Management Area

References

External links
 Heater's Island Wildlife Management Area

Wildlife management areas of Maryland
Protected areas of Frederick County, Maryland